"(Feels Like) Heaven" is a song by Scottish band Fiction Factory, which was released in 1983 as the second single from their debut studio album Throw the Warped Wheel Out. The track was a hit in Switzerland, reaching #2 on the singles chart. In the UK, it peaked at #6. Other chart positions include #10 in Germany, #14 in Sweden and #20 in Austria. The song is a regular feature on 1980s and new wave compilations.

Fiction Factory had no other notable successes beyond "(Feels Like) Heaven", marking the band as a one-hit wonder.

The song was written by Kevin Patterson and Eddie Jordan shortly after they had formed Fiction Factory with Chic Medley. The lyric has been described by the band as "an anti-love song", while recognising that it has come to have a different meaning for different people.

The song was referenced in Ariel Pink's 2017 song "Feels Like Heaven".

Critical reception
On its release, Ian Birch of Smash Hits wrote, "Imagine a smattering of H2O, China Crisis and The Lotus Eaters with a clean-cut production. One to watch in '84." Tony Jasper of Music Week noted the song "has a fetching feel with a good blend of vocals and backing track". Frank Edmonds of the Bury Free Press gave the song an 8 out of 10 rating and described it as a "truly impressive and pleasing little number, with a relaxed, catchy melody". In the US, David Okamoto of The Tampa Tribune described it as "the song Spandau Ballet would kill for" and "one of the prettiest singles of the year".

Track listing
7"
 "(Feels Like) Heaven"
 "Everyone But You"
12"
 "(Feels Like) Heaven"
 "Everyone But You"
 "This Is"

Charts

Dario G version
In 2003, the song was recorded by English dance act Dario G, titled "Heaven Is Closer (Feels Like Heaven)". The single reached the UK top 40, peaking at number 39 on the UK Singles Chart. It also charted in several other countries across Europe. This version mainly uses the "heaven is closer" refrain at the end of the original song as its hook.

Other versions
In 2008, the song was covered by Sylwania, a German dance project from the label Beatbox-Recordz.
In 2008, the song was covered and released as a bonus track on the album Werk 80 II by the German gothic metal band Atrocity.
In February 2012, the song was covered by Matt Consola featuring Ben Holder & LFB on Swishcraft Records. This release includes remixes by Joel Dickinson, Sean Mac, Christian Poow, SpekrFreks, Chubby Fingers and Swishcraft (AKA Matt Consola & LFB).
Slow Moving Millie covered the song on her 2011 album Renditions.
In 2016, the song was performed live by Manic Street Preachers during their Everything Must Go 20th anniversary tour. A studio recording was included on the compilation album BBC Radio 2's Sounds of the 80s, Vol. 2.
German musician Roosevelt covered the song on his 2021 album Polydans.

References 

1983 songs
1983 singles
1984 singles
2003 singles
Fiction Factory songs
CBS Records singles